Steinegg railway station is a railway station in the district of Rüte, in the Swiss canton of Appenzell Innerrhoden. It is located on the  Gossau–Wasserauen line of Appenzell Railways.

Services 
 the following services stop at Steinegg:

References

External links 
 
 

Railway stations in the canton of Appenzell Innerrhoden
Appenzell Railways stations